Lisa Small is an American art historian and museum curator. She is a curator of Exhibitions at the Brooklyn Museum, and most widely known for her 2014 blockbuster exhibition, Killer Heels.

Small earned her B.A. from B.A. from Colgate University, the M.A. and M.Phil from  City University of New York in  Art History, and an M.A. in Arts Administration from New York University.

She worked as a curator at the Dahesh Museum of Art and as Curator of Exhibitions at the American Federation of Arts before moving to the Brooklyn.

Books
Killer Heels: The Art of the High-Heeled Shoe Prestel, 2014 (3791353802)

References

American women curators
American art curators
Brooklyn Museum
American art historians
Women art historians
Living people
Year of birth missing (living people)
21st-century American women